James Samuel Emerson VC (3 August 1895 – 6 December 1917) was a British Army officer, and posthumous recipient of the Victoria Cross, the highest and most prestigious award for gallantry in the face of the enemy that can be awarded to British and Commonwealth forces.

Emerson was born 3 August 1895 in the village of Collon, County Louth in what is now the Republic of Ireland, to John and Ellen Emerson. When he was 22 years old, and a temporary second lieutenant in the 9th Battalion, The Royal Inniskilling Fusiliers (Tyrone Volunteers), British Army during the First World War, and was awarded the Victoria Cross for his actions on 6 December 1917, on the Hindenburg Line north of La Vacquerie, France. He died in action that same day.

Memorial
His name is inscribed on the war memorial at the Church of Ireland parish church at Collon, County Louth and on the Cambrai Memorial to the Missing.

References

Listed in order of publication year 
The Register of the Victoria Cross (1981, 1988 and 1997)

Ireland's VCs (Dept of Economic Development, 1995)
Monuments to Courage (David Harvey, 1999)
Irish Winners of the Victoria Cross (Richard Doherty & David Truesdale, 2000)

1895 births
1917 deaths
Irish World War I recipients of the Victoria Cross
British Army personnel of World War I
British military personnel killed in World War I
Royal Inniskilling Fusiliers officers
People from County Louth
British Army recipients of the Victoria Cross